The Kingdom of Sitawaka was a kingdom located in south-central Sri Lanka. It emerged from the division of the Kingdom of Kotte following the Spoiling of Vijayabahu in 1521. Over the course of the next seventy years it came to dominate much of the island. Sitawaka also offered fierce resistance to the Portuguese, who had arrived on the island in 1505. Despite its military successes, Sitawaka remained unstable, having to contend with repeated uprisings in its restive Kandyan territories, as well as a wide-ranging and often devastating conflict with the Portuguese. Sitawaka disintegrated soon after the death of its last king Rajasimha I in 1593.

History

Foundation
The Kingdom of Kotte had been the major power in western Sri Lanka since its foundation in the early 15th century; under Parakaramabahu VI, the polity has been the last to unite the entirety of the island of Sri Lanka under one crown. By 1467, however, the Jaffna Kingdom to the north had asserted its independence. In 1505 the first Portuguese arrived in Sri Lanka; by 1518 a large fleet of Portuguese ships had landed at Colombo and begun to construct a fort known as Santa Bárbara. To the east, the client kingdom of Kandy was by this time operating with a considerable degree of independence as well.

Vijayabahu VII of Kotte  (1509–1521) was deposed in a palace coup known as the Spoiling of Vijayabahu in 1521 by his three sons who feared their succession to the throne was about to be overlooked in favour of Vijayabahu's fourth son, Devaraja. The eldest succeeded him to the throne as Buvanekabahu VII, whilst the other two claimed parts of Kotte for themselves—Mayadunne ruling from Sitawaka and Pararajasinha establishing the kingdom of Raigama. The kingdom of Kandy was effectively outside of the control of any of these three successor states.

The kingdom of Sitawaka initially covered a relatively small area including Kosgama, Ruwanwella, Yatiyanthota, Hanwella, Padukka, Ehaliyagoda, Kuruwita and Rathnapura. The terrain was hilly, bordered to the east by Kandy and with no access to the sea.

Rise (1521–1551)
Soon after his ascent to the throne, Bhuvanekabahu began to strengthen his ties with the Portuguese in order to secure his throne from any potential challenge from Sitawaka. Though local resistance prevented them from completing a fortress in Colombo, from 1524 a Portuguese agent remained in Kotte under the king's protection and Portuguese naval forces began to contend with Malabari Mappilas for dominance of cinnamonere eventually repulsed by a Bhunvanekabahu, who was assisted by forces despatched by the Portuguese Viceroy of Goa. Another attempt at seizing Kotte in 1537 failed when Mayadunne's forces were defeated by forces under the command of the Portuguese Captain-General in Colombo, Afonso de Souza; a fleet sent from Calicut to assist was on this occasion defeated by the Portuguese at Vedalai. A truce was negotiated between Sitawaka and Kotte in the aftermath of the conflict, and Mayadunne turned his attention south to the kingdom of Raigama, which he annexed following the death of Raigam Bandara (Pararajasinha) in 1538.

Two further invasions of Kotte followed in the next five years. The first, beginning in 1539, failed following resistance organised by the new Portuguese Captain-General in Colombo, Miguel Ferreira. Calicut yet again provided troops and weaponry to Sitawaka; however, following defeat, Kulhenamarikkar and Pachimarikkar, two of the Zamorin's generals, were handed over to the Portuguese and the alliance between Calicut and Sitawaka ended. News in 1543 that Bhuvanekabahu had named his grandson Dharmapala as his successor prompted yet another invasion, yet again repulsed with the aid Portuguese forces under the command of the new Captain-General, António Barreto.

Conquest of Kotte (1551–1581)
Portuguese involvement in the internal politics of Kotte increased with the arrival in 1550 of viceroy Afonso de Noronha and a contingent of some 500 Portuguese soldiers. The Portuguese sacked Sitawaka later that year, but failed to retain the city. Accounts indicate that Mayadunne had adopted a policy of simply evacuating his capital and retreating into the surrounding terrain when the Portuguese approached—on occasion leaving the palace lights burning and spreading white cloth on the floor as a welcome for the invaders. Once the invaders had left the capital, the king's forces would then harass them along the route down to the Kelani river.

In 1551 Bhuvanekabahu was assassinated and succeeded by Dharmapala, who relied heavily on his European allies to maintain his hold over the kingdom. A new Portuguese fortress was constructed in Colombo in 1554, and by 1556 the 70,000 inhabitants in the vicinity of Colombo Fort had converted to Catholicism.

King Dharmapala himself converted to Catholicism in 1557 and adopted the name Dom João Pereira Bandara. Large numbers of Buddhist clergy and commoners fled the kingdom fearing persecution amidst rumours of forced conversions. Perhaps most significantly, the Tooth Relic—the most sacred object in the land and a traditional symbol of royal authority and inheritance—was smuggled out of Kotte and taken to Delgamu Viharaya in Ratnapura. Portuguese claims to have burnt the relic further inflamed the resentment of the populace. A Sitawakan invasion that year was repulsed by Captain-General Dom Afonso Pereira de Lacerda.

Kotte counter-attacked in 1562, with Lacerda leading a substantial force from Colombo along the banks of the river Kelani. At Mulleriyawa they encountered a force led by Tikiri Banda, Mayadunne's son; in the subsequent Mulleriyawa Satana a significant number of Portuguese and several thousand Lascarins were killed, and the invading force routed. The victory was a huge psychological boost for the Sitawakans, reflected in Tikiri Banda's acquisition of the moniker Rajasinha—"king of the lions".

Pressing their advantage, Mayadunne and Tikiri Bandara launched a two-pronged attack on Kotte in 1564, laying siege to both Kotte and Colombo. Portuguese forces were forced to retreat from Kotte with Dharmapala, leaving Sitawaka in control of much of the kingdom. Major Sitawakan garrisons were established at Wattala, Nagalagama and Mapane. However a thin coastal strip, running from Negombo to Galle and including the fort in Colombo, was kept provisioned from the sea by Portuguese ships and remained in Portuguese hands until after the collapse of Sitawaka a generation later. Strategically, this enabled them to harass and wage attritionary campaigns against the kingdom, the most notable being the invasion of 1574 which saw Negombo, Kalutara and Beruwala plundered, Sitawakan garrisons at Nagalagama and Mapane expelled, and the districts of Weligama and Chilaw ravaged. Portuguese influence culminated in Dharmapala's 1580 declaration that in the event of his death, the lands of Kotte would pass to Philip II.

Rajasinha I

Mayadunne died in 1581 and was succeeded by Rajasinha. In 1582, the new king invaded and conquered the kingdom of Kandy to the east, bringing the entirety of Sri Lanka into the Sitawakan fold, with the exception of the Jaffna Kingdom and Portuguese holdings in the south. Karaliyadde Bandara, king of Kandy, fled to Trincomalee and subsequently died of smallpox; his young daughter, Kusumasana Devi, came under the protection of the Portuguese, who baptised her Dona Catherina and over the next decade claimed the throne of Kandy in her name. Rajasinha's hold over the area was further disrupted by the rebellion of his viceroy Wirasundara Mudiyanse. Though the uprising was crushed, and Wirasundara murdered, his son Konappu Bandara fled into Portuguese territory. Baptised as Don Juan of Austria, he was to become an enduring opponent of the king of Sitawaka.

Portuguese intrigue in Rajasinha's court had dramatic results between 1583 and 1587; numerous nobles were executed following accusations of treachery. Most importantly Rajasinha turned against the Buddhist clergy following the discovery of collaboration with his enemies; temples were destroyed, Sri Pada seized and given over to Hindu priests, and Rajasinha himself converted to Hinduism. Many of the disaffected fled to the highlands.  In Kotte, King Dharmapala formalised his donation of 1580 on 4 November 1583. 

Rajasinha redoubled his efforts at dislodging Europeans and by 1587 he had amassed a force of some 50,000 infantry, as well as war elephants, cavalry, and a number of locally manufactured cannon. The army commenced what was to become a twenty-two month siege of Colombo that year. In the absence of a Sitawakan navy, the Portuguese—supplied from Goa via the sea—could hold out for extended periods of time. A shift in policy by Calicut ensured that there was no hope of rekindling the old alliance with the south Indian kingdom, and Rajasinha was forced to abandon the siege in February 1588 to deal with unrest further inland.

The last years of Rajasinha's reign were spent defending the kingdom's borders, a task made more difficult by the Portuguese invasion of the northern Jaffna Kingdom in 1591. The following year Portuguese forces briefly occupied Kandy, but were expelled. Nonetheless a new, and formidable, enemy had emerged in the form of Konappu Bandara, who had returned to Kandy in the early 1590s. Adopting the name Vimaladharmasuriya, he was seized the throne of Kandy, converted back to Buddhism, and married Don Catherina to legitimise his claim. In 1593, he defeated Rajasinha at Balane and Mawela, effectively securing Kandy's independence from Sitawaka. Rajasinha died the following year.

Despite the kingdom's impressive successes, much of its stability was dependent on a smooth succession and a competent ruler; Rajasimha's sudden death in 1593 (the same year the Portuguese appointed their first Governor-General of Ceylon) was met with neither of these and within less than a year Sitawaka had ceased to function as a cohesive polity.

Successor states and legacy
In 1594 the Portuguese forces sacked the city and pressed inland in the Campaign of Danture until they were expelled by Kandyan forces under Vimaladharmasuriya. The Portuguese remained the premier power in lowland Sri Lanka until the early 17th century, when they were finally expelled by Rajasinha II and his Dutch allies.

A resurgent kingdom of Kandy under Vimaladharmasuriya I also sacked Sitawaka, and went on to become the major source of resistance to European power for the next two hundred years. Avissawella was reduced to being a border town, and the royal complex was eventually lost to the jungle until explored by the British in the 19th century.

Military 
The Kingdom of Sitawaka was known for its military power that could challenge Europeans in conventional warfare and succeeded in keeping the Portuguese restrained to a coastal strip but attempts at entirely expelling them were unsuccessful. According to Portuguese sources, by 1587 the Kingdom was able to raise an army of 50,000-60,000 soldiers, armed with muskets and field cannons supported by 60,000 pioneers and servants, and a logistical train of 2200 pack elephants and 40,000 oxen. Despite the possibility of exaggeration, the army likely exceeded 30,000 soldiers. The 200-strong War Elephant corps was used to devastating effect against the Portuguese on open fields but was largely ineffective against fortified targets.

The greatest weakness of Sitawaka which stopped it from entirely removing the European foothold on the island was its inexperience in siege warfare and its weak navy. Sitawaka lacked siege artillery that could significantly damage forts built by the Portuguese who were vastly more experienced in siege warfare due to constant conflicts with Moors in the Iberian Peninsula and North Africa. Thus Sitwaka had to rely entirely on its large labor force to mine Portuguese forts during sieges. The Portuguese used their superior navy to defend coastal forts by bombarding Sitawaka forces and bringing in reinforcements from India. Rajasinha I attempted to build a capable navy and sought assistance from Kunjali admirals of Calicut and the Sumatran naval power of Acheh. As a result, Sitawaka managed to build up a small navy that while not effective against the Portuguese navy managed to impede trade and supplies.

See also
List of Kandyan monarchs
Mayadunne of Sitawaka
Sitawaka fort
Sri Lanka
History of Sri Lanka
List of monarchs of Sri Lanka
Kastane
Lascarins

References

 
1594 disestablishments in Asia
16th-century disestablishments in Sri Lanka
States and territories established in 1521
Former countries in South Asia
1521 establishments in Asia
16th-century establishments in Sri Lanka
Transitional period of Sri Lanka
Kingdoms of Sri Lanka
Former kingdoms